Pseudonocardia tropica is a bacterium from the genus of Pseudonocardia which has been isolated from the stem of the tree Maytenus austroyunnanensis in Xishuangbanna in China.

References

Pseudonocardia
Bacteria described in 2010